Radio Belgique (French) and Radio België (Dutch) were radio broadcasts transmitted to German-occupied Belgium from London during World War II. It was produced with the support of the Belgian government in exile and formed part of the BBC's European Service.

Background

On 10 May 1940, neutral Belgium was invaded by German forces. After 18 days of fighting, the Belgian army, along with King Leopold III, surrendered and the country was placed under German occupation. The Belgian government fled, first to France and then to the United Kingdom, where it formed a government in exile in London.

Radio Belgique
 was established on 28 September 1940 and broadcast in French and Dutch. The French service was put under the control of Victor de Laveleye (a former Liberal government minister), while Jan Moedwil was put in charge of the Dutch service. A press agency, INTERBEL, was founded for the radio, as a continuation of the pre-war BELGA agency.

De Laveleye was also responsible for inventing one of the station's most notable slogans: "We will get them, the Boches" ("Krijgen we ze wel, de moffen" in Dutch; "On les aura, les Boches" in French).

Though forbidden by the German occupiers,  was listened to by a majority of Belgians, far more than officially approved stations (like ) which broadcast German propaganda.

's programmes were broadcast in both French and Dutch. Originally, the programmes were broadcast from 21:00 to 21:15 each evening in French and Dutch on alternate days, but from Spring 1941, a morning edition and separate 17:30 programme allowed at least one in each language per day. From March 1943, the BBC broadcast daily programmes from Radio Belgique at 19:15 (in French) and 20:30 (in Dutch).

German response
Recognizing the potential effect that  could have on their control of information in the occupied country, the Germans rapidly created collaborationist radio stations, also aimed at a Belgian audience, using the remaining assets from the INR, the Francophone  ("Radio Brussels") and Dutch language . The Germans brought out radio blockers to disrupt the signal and made listening to  illegal in December 1940.

Radiodiffusion National Belge
During the later stages of World War II, the Belgian government sponsored the creation of a new radio broadcaster,  (RNB), which broadcast from London, New York City, and later from Léopoldville in the Belgian Congo. However, it only began to be received in Belgium from September 1944 during the liberation and soon afterwards  was removed from the air.

See also

Radio Londres
Radio Oranje
Radio Congo Belge

Notes

References

Further reading

External links
We krijgen ze wel, de moffen (program extract) at VRT
Homepage at La Guerre de Ondes.

Belgium in World War II
Defunct radio stations in the United Kingdom
BBC World Service foreign language
Belgian Resistance
Radio stations established in 1940
1940 establishments in Belgium
1940 establishments in England
German occupation of Belgium during World War II
Radio in Belgium
1944 disestablishments in Belgium
1944 disestablishments in England
Radio during World War II
Belgium–United Kingdom relations
Radio stations disestablished in 1944
Defunct mass media in Belgium
Dutch-language radio stations in Belgium
French-language radio stations in Belgium